Mixed Blood is a 1985 film directed by Paul Morrissey and John Leguizamo's film debut.

Plot
Rita La Punta (Marília Pêra) leads a gang of underaged Brazilian kids in an attempt to seize control of New York's Lower East Side's drug trade from a Puerto Rican gang.

Principal cast

Critical reception
The film received generally positive reviews.

Vincent Canby of The New York Times wrote:Paul Morrissey continues to be a cinema original and his ''Mixed Blood,'' a most unorthodox look at life in the drug trade on New York's Lower East Side, is successively comic, brutal, primitive and sophisticated—a comedy with the manners of a live-action cartoon for jaded adults.Morrisey's former collaborator Andy Warhol stated in The Andy Warhol Diaries:Paul's movie Mixed Blood is playing midnights at the Waverly ... And I just loved the movie. It was everything he's done before, but it was photographed well and he seemed to know so much about the Lower East Side and the Alphabet—avenues A, B, C, and D—for someone who hadn't been in New York for so long.Sid Smith wrote for the Chicago Tribune:Although still fairly crude, the movie has more style than Morrissey's earlier pictures, and the lovely salsa score provides a biting undertone and subtlety Morrissey once avoided. It's not a perfect picture, and sometimes it's a boring one, but ''Mixed Blood'' is a fairly successful neo-realist look at something most moviemakers wouldn't go near.

References

External links 

1985 crime films
1985 films
American crime films
American gang films
Films directed by Paul Morrissey
Films produced by Alain Sarde
Films set in New York City
Films shot in New York City
1980s English-language films
1980s American films

1980s black comedy films
American black comedy films